Institute of Hotel Management, Aurangabad is a hotel management school located in Aurangabad, Maharashtra, India. It was established in 1989 by The Maulana Azad Education Trust Aurangabad in association with Taj Group and is situated in Dr. Rafiq Zakaria Campus of the Maulana Azad College of Arts and Science, Aurangabad. Initially they offered certificate courses from 1989 to 1995, in 1996 they started offering Diplomas and in 1999 they started offering Degrees. It is affiliated to University of Huddersfield and approved by All India Council for Technical Education, New Delhi.

Courses
Institute of Hotel Management, Aurangabad offers Bachelor of Arts (honours) degrees in hotel management and culinary arts.

References 

Universities and colleges in Maharashtra
Hospitality schools in India
Education in Aurangabad, Maharashtra
Educational institutions established in 1989
All India Council for Technical Education
1989 establishments in Maharashtra